Czesław Sobieraj (17 July 1914 - 25 July 1985) was a Polish sprint canoeist who competed from the late 1930s to the late 1940s. He won a silver medal in the K-1 10000 m event at the 1938 ICF Canoe Sprint World Championships in Vaxholm.

Sobieraj also competed at the 1948 Summer Olympics in London, finishing seventh in the K-1 10000 m event while being eliminated in the semifinals of the K-1 1000 m event.

References

Sports-reference.com profile

1914 births
1985 deaths
Canoeists at the 1948 Summer Olympics
Olympic canoeists of Poland
Polish male canoeists
People from Szamotuły County
ICF Canoe Sprint World Championships medalists in kayak
Sportspeople from Greater Poland Voivodeship